Conor Whelan (born 31 October 1996) is an Irish hurler who plays as a right corner forward for club side Kinvara and at inter-county level for the Galway senior hurling team.

Playing career

University of Galway

As a student at the University of Galway, Whelan has been a regular player on the university's senior hurling team in the Fitzgibbon Cup.

Kinvara

Whelan joined the Kinvara club at a young age and played in all grades at juvenile and underage levels before joining the club's intermediate team.

Galway

Minor and under-21

Whelan first played for Galway as a member of the minor hurling team on 28 July 2013. He made his first appearance in a 1-19 to 0-13 All-Ireland quarter-final defeat of Laois. On 8 September 2013, Whelan was at right corner-forward in Galway's 1-21 to 0-16 defeat by Waterford in the All-Ireland final at Croke Park.

Whelan's second and final season with the Galway minor team ended with a 1-27 to 2-09 All-Ireland semi-final defeat by Limerick on 17 August 2014.

As a member of the Galway under-21 hurling team, Whelan made his first appearance on 22 August 2015 in a 1-20 to 0-17 All-Ireland semi-final defeat by Limerick.

On 10 September 2016, Whelan scored two points in a 5-15 to 0-14 defeat by Waterford in the All-Ireland final.

Whelan ended the 2017 championship by being named on the Bord Gáis Energy Team of the Year.

Intermediate

On 1 July 2015, Whelan made his first appearance for the Galway intermediate hurling team. He later won a Leinster Championship medal following Galway's 1-20 to 0-11 defeat of Wexford in the final.

Senior

Whelan made his debut for the Galway senior team on 26 July 2015, scoring 1-02 from play in a 2-28 to 0-22 All-Ireland quarter-final defeat of Cork. On 6 September 2015, Whelan scored two points from right wing-forward in a 1-22 to 1-18 defeat by Kilkenny in the All-Ireland final.

On 23 April 2017, Whelan scored five points from play when Galway defeated Tipperary by 3-21 to 0-14 to win the National Hurling League. Later that season he won his first Leinster Championship medal after Galway's 0-29 to 1-17 defeat of Wexford in the final. On 3 September 2017, Whelan started for Galway at right corner-forward when they won their first All-Ireland in 29 years after a 0-26 to 2-17 defeat of Waterford in the final. He ended the season by winning an All-Star award as well as being named All Stars Young Hurler of the Year.

On 8 July 2018, Whelan won a second successive Leinster Championship medal following Galway's 1-28 to 3-15 defeat of Kilkenny in the final. On 19 August 2018, he scored a goal from right corner-forward in Galway's 3-16 to 2-18 All-Ireland final defeat by Limerick.

Career statistics

Honours

Galway
 All-Ireland Senior Hurling Championship (1): 2017 
Leinster Senior Hurling Championship (2): 2017, 2018
National Hurling League Division 1 (2): 2017, 2021
Leinster Intermediate Hurling Championship (1): 2015

Awards
All Stars Young Hurler of the Year (1): 2017
GAA GPA All Stars Awards (1): 2017

References

1996 births
Living people
All-Ireland Senior Hurling Championship winners
Alumni of the University of Galway
Galway inter-county hurlers
Kinvara hurlers
University of Galway hurlers
People from Kinvara